Lundeen is a surname. Notable people with the surname include:

Bob Lundeen (born 1952), American ice hockey player
Ernest Lundeen (1878–1940), American lawyer and politician
Evelyn Lundeen (1900–1963), American nurse 
Paul Lundeen, American politician